Pamphorichthys is a genus of poeciliids native to the Amazon, Paraguay, São Francisco and Itapicuru basins in South America.

Some authorities consider Pamphorichthys to be a subgenus of Poecilia.

Species
There are currently six recognized species in this genus:
 Pamphorichthys araguaiensis W. J. E. M. Costa, 1991
 Pamphorichthys hasemani (Henn, 1916)
 Pamphorichthys hollandi (Henn, 1916)
 Pamphorichthys minor (Garman, 1895) (Mini-molly)
 Pamphorichthys pertapeh C. A. A. de Figueiredo, 2008
 Pamphorichthys scalpridens (Garman, 1895)

References

Poeciliidae
Freshwater fish genera
Taxa named by Charles Tate Regan
Ray-finned fish genera